Françoise d'Eaubonne (12 March 1920 – 3 August 2005) was a French author, labour rights activist, environmentalist, and feminist. Her 1974 book, Le Féminisme ou la Mort, introduced the term ecofeminism. She co-founded the Front homosexuel d'action révolutionnaire, a homosexual revolutionary alliance in Paris.

Life and career 
Her mother was a teacher, a child of a Carlist revolutionary. Her father was an anarcho-syndicalist and the secretary general of an insurance company. Both of her parents were members of the religious Sillon movement.  When she was at the age of 16, the Spanish Civil War broke out. Later, she would express her feelings in this period of her life with the title "Chienne de Jeunesse".

A member of the French Communist Party from 1945-1957, in 1971, she co-founded the Front homosexuel d'action révolutionnaire (FHAR), a homosexual revolutionary movement. Also that year, she signed the Manifesto of the 343 declaring she had an abortion. She is considered the founder of the ecological and social movement of ecofeminism. She created the Ecology-Feminism (Ecologie-Feminisme) Center in Paris in 1972. In 1974 she published her book Le féminisme ou la mort (Feminism or Death) where she first coined the term ecofeminism. In the book, she speaks of a special connection women share with nature and encourages women's environmental activism. She cites toxic masculinity as the cause of population growth, pollution, and other destructive influences on the environment. Many scholars shared d'Eaubonne's view on women's inherent connection to nature. These scholars include Sherry Ortner, Rosemary Radford Ruether, Susan Griffin, and Carolyn Merchant. 

Following her motto, "Not a day without a line", Françoise d'Eaubonne wrote more than 50 works, from Colonnes de l'âme (poetry, 1942) to L'Évangile de Véronique (essay, 2003). Her historical novel Comme un vol de gerfauts (1947) was translated into English as A Flight of Falcons, and extracts from her essay Feminism or Death appeared in the 1974 anthology New French Feminisms. She also wrote science fiction novels, like L'échiquier du temps and Rêve de feu, Le sous-marin de l'espace.

Bibliography
Novels:
Le cœur de Watteau, 1944 
Comme un vol de gerfauts, prix des lecteurs 1947 
Belle Humeur ou la Véridique Histoire de Mandrin,1957 
J'irai cracher sur vos tombes, 1959 (after the film I Spit on Your Grave) 
Les Tricheurs, 1959 (after the film Les Tricheurs) 
Jusqu'à la gauche, 1963 
Les Bergères de l'Apocalypse, 1978 
On vous appelait terroristes, 1979 
Je ne suis pas née pour mourir, 1982 
Terrorist's blues, 1987 
Floralies du désert, 1995 
Biographies:
La vie passionnée d'Arthur Rimbaud, 1957 
La vie passionnée de Verlaine, 1959 
Une femme témoin de son siècle, Germaine de Staël, 1966 
La couronne de sable, vie d'Isabelle Eberhardt, 1967 
L'éventail de fer ou la vie de Qiu Jin, 1977 
Moi, Kristine, reine de Suède, 1979 
L'impératrice rouge : moi, Jiang King, veuve Mao, 1981 
L'Amazone Sombre : vie d'Antoinette Lix, 1983 
Louise Michel la Canaque, 1985 
Une femme nommée Castor, 1986 
Les scandaleuses, 1990 
L'évangile de Véronique, 2000 
Essays:
Le complexe de Diane, érotisme ou féminisme, 1951 
Y a-t-il encore des hommes?, 1964 
Eros minoritaire, 1970 
Le féminisme ou la mort, 1974 
Feminism or death, 2022
Les femmes avant le patriarcat, 1976 
Contre violence ou résistance à l'état, 1978 
Histoire de l'art et lutte des sexes, 1978 
Écologie, féminisme : révolution ou mutation ?, 1978 
S comme Sectes, 1982 
La femme russe, 1988 
Féminin et philosophie : une allergie historique, 1997 
La liseuse et la lyre, 1997 
Le sexocide des sorcières, 1999 
Poems:
Columns of the soul, 1942 
Rutten, 1951 
Neither place nor meter, 1981

References

1920 births
2005 deaths
20th-century French novelists
Anarcho-communists
Ecofeminists
French anarchists
French communists
French socialists
French feminists
French environmentalists
French abortion-rights activists
French anti-fascists
French anti-capitalists
French syndicalists
French women novelists
Left-libertarians
Left-libertarianism
Left-wing politics in France
Libertarian socialists
French LGBT rights activists
Marxist feminists
Syndicalists
French socialist feminists
Writers from Paris
20th-century French women
Signatories of the 1971 Manifesto of the 343